Touch-Me-Not (봉선화 - Bongseonhwa) is a 1956 South Korean film directed by Kim Ki-young.

Synopsis
A historical melodrama about a love triangle within a group of bandits.

Cast
 Na Gang-hui
 An Seok-jin
 Beak Song
 Hong Il-hwa
 Ko Seol-bong
 Go Seon-ae
 Park Am
 Lee Hyeon
 Kang Kye-shik
 Jo Hyang

References

Bibliography
 
 
 

1956 films
1950s Korean-language films
Films directed by Kim Ki-young
South Korean historical films
1950s historical films
South Korean black-and-white films